Piet Huysentruyt (born 7 December 1962) is a Belgian TV chef and the author of five bestselling cooking books.

Biography
Piet Huytsentruyt, born in 1962, studied at the cooking school Ter Duinen in Koksijde before working in a number of restaurants in Belgium and abroad. He opened his own restaurant in Wortegem-Petegem, and got his first Michelin Guide star a few years later.

Television
He starred in a few TV shows, the most famous being SOS Piet, which spawned two books.

Publishing
By December 2008, he has sold 250,000 copies of his books SOS Piet and SOS Piet 2, and his books top the bestseller list in Flanders in December 2008. In December 2009, he appeared in the new film about Kabouter Plop, Plop en de Kabouterbaby.

Notes

External links
Homepage of SOS Piet TV show

Belgian non-fiction writers
Belgian male writers
Belgian chefs
Living people
1962 births
Male non-fiction writers